William John Payne (25 December 1881 – 22 July 1967) was an Australian rules footballer who played for Carlton in the Victorian Football League (VFL) during the early 1900s.

Recruited from Footscray via Numurkah, Payne was a half-back flanker and played in Carlton's losing 1904 VFL Grand Final in his debut season.

He was one of Carlton's stars in their 1906 VFL Grand Final premiership, being awarded best on ground honours.

Also used at centre half-back and full back, Payne played in both of Carlton's 1907 VFL Grand Final and in their 1908 VFL Grand Final wins to complete a hat-trick of flags.

He played for Ararat after leaving Carlton.

External links

Blueseum profile

1881 births
1967 deaths
Carlton Football Club players
Carlton Football Club Premiership players
Footscray Football Club (VFA) players
Ararat Football Club players
Australian rules footballers from Victoria (Australia)
Three-time VFL/AFL Premiership players